Zoe Swicord Kazan (born September 9, 1983) is an American actress, playwright, and screenwriter. She made her acting debut in the film Swordswallowers and Thin Men (2003) and later appeared in films such as The Savages (2007), Revolutionary Road (2008), and It's Complicated (2009). She starred in Happythankyoumoreplease (2010), Meek's Cutoff (2010), Ruby Sparks (2012), and What If (2013). In 2014, she appeared in the HBO miniseries Olive Kitteridge, for which she received an Emmy nomination. She portrayed Emily Gardner in the film The Big Sick (2017), and in 2018 appeared in the Coen Brothers film The Ballad of Buster Scruggs in the episode "The Gal Who Got Rattled".

She has appeared in several Broadway productions. She also wrote Ruby Sparks and co-wrote Wildlife (2018) with her partner Paul Dano (who directed Wildlife and co-starred with Kazan in Ruby Sparks). In 2020, she co-starred in the HBO miniseries The Plot Against America and in 2021, she co-starred as Pia Brewer in the Netflix limited series Clickbait.

Early life
Kazan was born in Los Angeles, the daughter of screenwriters Nicholas Kazan and Robin Swicord. Her paternal grandparents were film and theatre director Elia Kazan and playwright Molly Kazan (née Thacher). Elia was an Anatolian Greek emigrant from Istanbul, while Molly was a Mayflower descendant. The family surname was originally Kazantzoglou (Greek: Καζαντζόγλου).

Kazan was educated at the private Wildwood School, Windward School, and at the Marlborough School in Hancock Park, Los Angeles. She attended Yale University where she was a member of the Manuscript Society, and graduated in 2005 with a Bachelor of Arts degree in theatre.

Career

2000s 
After her film debut in 2003 as Samantha in Swordswallowers and Thin Men, Kazan had her first professional stage role in the 2006 off-Broadway revival of The Prime of Miss Jean Brodie, starring Cynthia Nixon.

In 2007, she had a small role in The Savages, starring Laura Linney and Philip Seymour Hoffman, and guest-appeared in an episode of Medium. She next appeared in the films Fracture and In the Valley of Elah. That fall, she returned to the stage in a The New Group production of 100 Saints You Should Know and Jonathan Marc Sherman's Things We Want, directed by Ethan Hawke.

In January 2008, Kazan made her Broadway debut opposite S. Epatha Merkerson and Kevin Anderson in a revival of William Inge's Come Back, Little Sheba. Ben Brantley of The New York Times called her performance "first-rate", adding, "Ms. Kazan is terrific in conveying the character's self-consciousness." In the fall, she appeared on stage as Masha in a Broadway revival of Anton Chekhov's The Seagull opposite Kristin Scott Thomas, Carey Mulligan, and Peter Sarsgaard. That year she also had roles in August, Me and Orson Welles and Revolutionary Road.

Kazan is also a playwright. In 2009, her play Absalom premiered at the Humana Festival of New American Plays in Louisville, Kentucky. The play, about a father's tense relationships with his children, had been extensively read and workshopped since Kazan's junior year at Yale. She ended the year playing Meryl Streep's daughter in the Nancy Meyers comedy It's Complicated. She appeared in the Broadway production of A Behanding in Spokane with Christopher Walken and Sam Rockwell until June 6, 2010. She also had lead roles in the movies I Hate Valentine's Day and The Exploding Girl, both released in 2009.

2010s 
In 2010, she had a main role in the comedy-drama Happy. Thank You. More. Please. as Mary Catherine, the cousin of Josh Radnor's character. She also starred as Millie Gately in 2010 (alongside Paul Dano, playing her husband) in Kelly Reichardt's independent Western drama Meek's Cutoff. In the fall, Kazan played Harper Pitt in Signature Theatre Company's 20th-anniversary production of Tony Kushner's Angels in America. On the small screen, she appeared in four episodes of HBO's Bored to Death as Nina, the love interest of a fictionalized Jonathan Ames, played by Jason Schwartzman.

Her play We Live Here, about a dysfunctional family, received its world premiere production from October 12 to November 6, 2011 at the off-Broadway Manhattan Theater Club in New York City. Among the ensemble cast was Amy Irving, and the director was 2010 Obie Award winner Sam Gold.

Kazan's next project, for which she wrote the screenplay, was Ruby Sparks, a comedy-romance film directed by Jonathan Dayton and Valerie Faris, and starring Kazan, Paul Dano, Chris Messina, Antonio Banderas, Annette Bening, Deborah Ann Woll and Steve Coogan.

In 2014, her third play, Trudy and Max in Love, opened at the South Coast Repertory. Also in 2014, she starred in the HBO miniseries Olive Kitteridge, which earned her a Primetime Emmy Award nomination for Best Supporting Actress in a Limited Series.

In 2017, Kazan co-starred in the critically acclaimed independent film The Big Sick with Kumail Nanjiani and Holly Hunter. In 2018, Wildlife was released to great critical acclaim. Kazan co-wrote the film with her partner Paul Dano, who also directed. It stars Carey Mulligan and Jake Gyllenhaal. Kazan then starred in Joel and Ethan Coen's Western anthology film, The Ballad of Buster Scruggs, in the vignette "The Gal Who Got Rattled". Many critics considered her performance one of the film's highlights.

2020 
In 2020, Kazan starred in the limited series The Plot Against America as Elizabeth "Bess" Levin, a version of the mother of author Philip Roth, on whose book the show was based. It debuted on HBO, and also featured Winona Ryder, Anthony Boyle, and John Turturro. 

Kazan starred in Clickbait, a limited series for Netflix; and the film She Said, portraying Jodi Kantor.

Personal life
Kazan has been in a relationship with actor Paul Dano since 2007. Their daughter was born in August 2018. Their second child, a son, was born in October 2022.

Filmography

Film

Television

Theatre roles

Awards and nominations

References

External links

 
 
 

1983 births
21st-century American actresses
21st-century American dramatists and playwrights
21st-century American women writers
Actresses from Los Angeles
American film actresses
American people of English descent
American people of German descent
American writers of Greek descent
American stage actresses
American television actresses
American women dramatists and playwrights
Living people
Screenwriters from California
Writers from Los Angeles
Yale University alumni
Kazan family
21st-century American screenwriters